The 23rd Canadian Film Awards were held on October 1, 1971 to honour achievements in Canadian film. The ceremony was hosted by Leslie Nielsen.

Winners

Films
Film of the Year: Not awarded
Best Picture: Mon oncle Antoine — National Film Board of Canada, [[[Marc Beaudet]] producer, Claude Jutra director
Documentary Under 30 Minutes: The Sea — National Film Board of Canada, Bill Brind, Tom Daly and Colin Low producers, Bané Jovanovic director
Documentary Over 30 Minutes: Les Philharmonistes — National Film Board of Canada, François Séguillon producer, Yves Leduc director
Theatrical Short: Don't Knock the Ox — National Film Board of Canada, William Canning producer, Tony Ianzelo director
Animated: Evolution — National Film Board of Canada, Michael Mills producer and director
Arts and Experimental: Essai à la mille (Test to the Thousand) — Jean-Claude Labrecque, and
Found Sculpture: Victor Tinkl — ETV, Christopher Homer
TV Drama: The Megantic Outlaw — Canadian Broadcasting Corporation, Ron Kelly producer
TV Information: The Human Journey: The Early Years — CTV Television Network, Jerry Lawton director
Nature and Wildlife: Temples of Time — National Film Board of Canada, William Canning producer and director
Travel and Recreation: Alberta: Under the Sun — Chinook Films, C. N. Ross and Eric Jensen producers, and
Ski de Fond (Cross-Country Skiing) — National Film Board of Canada, François Séguillon producer, Roger Rochat director
Public Relations: Shebandowan: A Summer Place — Westminster Films, Lee Gordon and Donald Haldane producers
Sales Promotion: Containerization — Canawest Films, Brant E. Ducey producer
Training and Instruction: It Starts at the Top — Chetwynd Films, Arthur Chetwynd and Ross McConnell producers, Ross McConnell director

Feature Film Craft Awards
Performance by a Lead Actor: Jean Duceppe - Mon oncle Antoine (NFB)
Performance by a Lead Actress: Ann Knox - The Only Thing You Know (Clarke Mackey Films)
Supporting Actor: Danny Freedman - Fortune and Men's Eyes (Cinemex/MGM) 
Supporting Actress: Olivette Thibault - Mon oncle Antoine (NFB)
Art Direction: Alexander Kuznetsov - Tiki Tiki (Potterton Productions)
Cinematography: Michel Brault - Mon oncle Antoine (NFB)
Direction: Claude Jutra - Mon oncle Antoine (NFB)
Film Editing: Douglas Robertson - Fortune and Men's Eyes (Cinemex/MGM) 
Sound Editing: Not awarded
Music Score: Jean Cousineau - Mon oncle Antoine (NFB)
Original Screenplay: Clément Perron - Mon oncle Antoine (NFB)
Overall Sound: Roger Lamoureux - Mon oncle Antoine (NFB)

Non-Feature Craft Awards
Performance by a Lead Actor: Colin Fox - Durham and the Two Nations
Performance by a Lead Actress: Carole Lazare - The Megantic Outlaw (CBC)
Art Direction: Richard Lambert - The Magnificent Gift
Black-and-White Cinematography: Ron Hallis and Henry Zemel - Toni, Randi and Marie
Colour Cinematography: Bill Mason - Death of a Legend (NFB)
Direction: Michael McKennirey - Atonement (NFB)
Film Editing: John Sannen - Genetics: Man the Creator
Sound Editing: Serge Beauchemin - Les Philharmonistes (NFB)
Music Score: Larry Crosley - Seasons in the Mind (Milne-Pearson Productions)
Screenplay: Don Arioli - Hot Stuff and Propaganda Message (NFB)
Non-Dramatic Script: Claude Péloquin - L'Homme nouveau (NFB)
Sound Recording: Dan Gibson - Sounds of Nature (Dan Gibson Productions)
Sound Re-Recording: Film House - North of Superior (IMAX)

Special AwardsMultiscreen Corporation "for outstanding technical achievement with respect to the IMAX system".Clarke Mackey "for outstanding achievement in making his first feature film, The Only Thing You Know".
John Drainie Award: Lister Sinclair' "for outstanding contributions to broadcasting".

References

Canadian
Canadian Film Awards (1949–1978)
1971 in Canada